Lingkaran Tengah Utama Expressway,  previously known as  Central Spine Road (CSR) or Kuala Krai–Kuala Pilah Highway, Federal Route 34, is a new toll-free highway under construction in the center of Peninsular Malaysia. The 325 km (201 miles) highway is built to eventually replace the former two-lane Malaysia Federal Route 8 (Gua Musang Highway) and Malayaia Federal Route 9 (Karak–Tampin highway). Construction of CSR starts at Package 3 which is from Merapoh to Kampung Relong. It commences at Package 3 as the Gua Musang Highway passes through Chegar Perah which is prone to roadkill. The highway has a long eco-viaduct built in this section. Package 5 which is from north Raub to Karak will be built next, which will connect it to E8 Kuala Lumpur–Karak Expressway bypassing Bentong and Mempaga. This will help detour traffic from the steep mountainous grade between Raub and Bentong. It was formerly known as  Central Spine Expressway.

History
 On 15 December 2016, section 3H (Kg. Kechur to Kg. Sbrg. Jelai) was opened to traffic
Phase 1 is a 51 km stretch from Kuala Krai to Jambatan Sungai Lakit in Kelantan.
Phase 2 spans 63 km from Jambatan Sungai Lakit to Gua Musang in Kelantan 
Phase 3 covers 107 km from Gua Musang to Kampung Relong in Pahang.
Phase 4 comprises 56 km from Kampung Relong to Raub in Pahang 
Phase 5, 54 km from Raub to Bentong
Phase 6, is 47 km and connects Bentong and Simpang Pelangai.

Features
 Four lanes, two on each side
 A long eco-viaduct for wild animals crossing
 Some sections are concrete paved, making CSR as the only newly completed road paved using concrete

In most sections, the original Federal Route was built under JKR R5 road standards, allowing maximum speed limit of up to 90 km/h.

From Kampung Sungai Yu to Chegar Perah and from Chegar Perah to Bukit Tujuh, it overlaps Federal Route 8 Merapoh Highway.

Federal Route 8 may eventually remain as an alternative route.

There are no sections with motorcycle lanes.

List of interchanges

References

External links
 Central Spine Road on Facebook

Highways in Malaysia
Malaysian Federal Roads